Largo Vista (corruption of Larga Vista, Spanish for "Wide View") is an unincorporated community in Los Angeles County, California, United States.

References

Unincorporated communities in Los Angeles County, California
Unincorporated communities in California